The Casa Consulado, also known as Iturralde Mansion or Iturralde House, is a heritage house located in Quiapo, Manila, Philippines. The house typifies the architectural style of Bandehadong Bahay na Bato that was common during the 1920s in the Philippines.

History

The former Consulate of Monaco in the Philippines
The house was constructed in the 1926 in a lot previously owned by Don Mariano Garchitorena following the Bandehado style of Bahay na Bato. In 1936 the house was acquired by the family of Don Jose Iturralde and his wife Doña Dominga Alvaro. Their son, Dr. Augusto Alvaro Iturralde, was appointed as Honorary Consul of the Principality of Monaco to the Philippines, and converted the house as his office and as the Consulate House of Monaco in the Philippines.

See also
Ancestral houses of the Philippines

References

Houses in Metro Manila
Buildings and structures in Quiapo, Manila
Heritage Houses in the Philippines
Houses completed in 1926
20th-century architecture in the Philippines